Waeringopterus is a genus of prehistoric eurypterids from the Silurian of North America. The genus contains two species, W. apfeli from the Syracuse and Vernon Formations of New York and Ontario and W. cumberlandicus from the Wills Creek Formation, West Virginia. Fossils of the genus also were found in the Indian Point Formation of Quebec.

References

External links 
 Waeringopterus- Eurypterids.net

Diploperculata
Ludlow life
Silurian eurypterids
Eurypterids of North America
Paleontology in New York (state)
Paleozoic life of Ontario
Paleozoic life of Quebec